Phupa may be,

Phupa language
Supachai Phupa
Surachet Phupa